Tyree Jackson (born November 7, 1997) is an American football tight end for the Philadelphia Eagles of the National Football League (NFL). He played college football as a quarterback at Buffalo. He played for the DC Defenders of the XFL in 2020.

Early years
Jackson attended Mona Shores High School in Norton Shores, Michigan where he was the starting varsity QB all four years of high school. During his career, he passed for 4,491 yards with 50 touchdowns, had 8,149 yards of total offense and had a 24–18 record. He committed to the University at Buffalo to play college football after receiving offers from Central Michigan, Eastern Michigan, Western Michigan and UConn.

College career

After redshirting his first year at Buffalo in 2015, Jackson played in 10 games and made nine starts in 2016. He finished the season completing 165 of 311 passes for 1,772 yards, nine touchdowns and nine interceptions. As a sophomore in 2017, he started eight games and missed four due to an injury. He completed 143 of 237 passes for 2,096 yards, 12 touchdowns and three interceptions. Jackson returned as the starter in 2018, where he was named MAC Offensive Player of the Year and lead the Bulls to a 10–4 season, a MAC East division title and a bowl game appearance in the Dollar General Bowl. On January 6, 2019, Jackson announced that he would forgo his senior season to pursue a career in the NFL. He was invited to the 2019 Senior Bowl, playing for the South team and being named team MVP.

College statistics

Professional career

Buffalo Bills 
Following the conclusion of the 2019 NFL Draft, Jackson signed with the Buffalo Bills as an undrafted free agent on April 27, 2019. Jackson started the fourth game of the preseason at quarterback and led a comeback to erase a 23-6 deficit with under four minutes remaining in the fourth quarter. He was waived during final roster cuts on August 31, 2019.

DC Defenders 
In October 2019, Jackson was drafted in the ninth round in the 2020 XFL Draft by the DC Defenders. During the first two games, both Defenders victories under starter Cardale Jones, Jackson's only statistic was one rush for 5 yards. Jackson saw increased but limited snaps during the next two games which were both blowout losses for the Defenders, including a shutout to the previously winless Tampa Bay Vipers in week 4. Jackson entered in relief of Jones in week 5, kick-starting a Defenders' victory by going 9-14 for 39 yards and a touchdown, caught by Khari Lee. Within the next few days, the rest of the season was canceled due to the COVID-19 pandemic. Jackson finished the shortened 5-game XFL season by going 11-18 for 46 yards and a touchdown, and 9 rushes for 28 yards. He had his contract terminated when the league suspended operations on April 10, 2020.

Philadelphia Eagles 
On January 7, 2021, the Philadelphia Eagles signed Jackson to a reserve/futures contract as a tight end. During his transition from quarterback to tight end, Jackson was having a very promising training camp, with some believing that he could earn a roster spot. However, he suffered a fractured bone in his back on August 17. He was placed on injured reserve on September 2, 2021.

He was activated on November 6 and made his NFL debut on November 7, appearing in 14 plays on offense and 4 plays on special teams. On November 21, he was targeted with a pass for the first time in his career, but the throw from Jalen Hurts was incomplete. Two weeks later, he started a game for the first time in his career. In the final game of the regular season on January 8, 2022, Jackson caught the first pass of his NFL career, a three-yard shovel pass from Gardner Minshew, for his first career touchdown. Later in that game, he tore his ACL, ending his season. He was officially placed on the injured reserve list two days later. He was placed on the Active/PUP list on July 27, 2022. He was placed on the reserve list on August 23, 2022, to start the season. He was activated from the PUP list on November 16, 2022. Without Jackson, the Eagles reached Super Bowl LVII but lost 38-35 to the Kansas City Chiefs.

References

External links
Philadelphia Eagles bio
Buffalo Bulls bio

1997 births
Living people
People from Muskegon County, Michigan
Players of American football from Michigan
American football quarterbacks
American football tight ends
Buffalo Bulls football players
Buffalo Bills players
DC Defenders players
Philadelphia Eagles players
African-American players of American football
21st-century African-American sportspeople